Can Sunyer del Palau is a residential area within the hills of the municipality of the Catalan town Castellví de Rosanes (Spain). It counted 434 inhabitants in 2005.

References 

Baix Llobregat

ca:Can Sunyer del Palau